Tamaryū Daizō  (born 22 July 1954 as Daizō Nagata) is a former sumo wrestler from Nagasaki, Japan. He made his debut in 1970, retiring in 1992. He was one of the lighter sekitori wrestlers. His highest rank was komusubi. He was a member of Kataonami stable.

Career
He was the second son of a forester. He did judo at the Higashi-Nagasaki junior high school. In his third year of junior high he was persuaded by the former head coach of Nishonoseki stable, the former sekiwake Tamanoumi Umekichi, to try sumo. He was initially reluctant, but was persuaded by the fact that Tamanoumi Umekichi, by then a well-known NHK sumo commentator, was also from Nagasaki. He joined an offshoot of Nishonoseki stable, Katonami, set up by another former sekiwake, Tamanoumi Daitarō.
 
He made his professional debut in January 1970. Due to his small size, (he was only   and  when he first joined) he made slow progress through the divisions. In March 1972 he changed his shikona from his family name of Nagata to Tamaryū ("jewelled dragon"). He did not reach sekitori status until May 1979 when he was promoted to the jūryō division. Due to a fractured finger he was able to score only three wins in his jūryō debut and was demoted. He finally managed to return to jūryō in July 1981, and he  reached the top makuuchi division in May 1982. It had taken 73 tournaments from his professional debut, or 12 and a half years.

He fought in the middle to the lower half of the maegashira ranks for the next year and a half, but due to a long-standing elbow injury he dropped back to jūryō at the end of 1983. He was the last man to fight Takamiyama, the first foreigner to win a top division tournament, in May 1984. He continued to struggle and in November 1984 he fell back to the makushita division. He was over 30 years old by this time, but won the makushita championship or yūshō with a perfect 7–0 record.  He followed this up by winning the jūryō division championship in March 1985 and was promoted back to makuuchi. In June 1985 he participated with other top division wrestlers in a three-day exhibition tournament at Madison Square Garden, the first time a tournament had been held in New York.

In March 1986 he reached his highest rank to date of maegashira 2, and though he only scored 5–10 he defeated the tournament winner Hoshi and ōzeki Asashio. In November 1986 on the fourth day he defeated Chiyonofuji to earn his first (and only) kinboshi for a win over a yokozuna, in his 102nd career tournament, which is the slowest ever. His highest rank was komusubi which he held for one tournament in November 1987 at the age of 33. It had taken him 108 tournaments from his professional debut to reach the rank, which is also the slowest ever. Although he had only scored 8–7 from maegashira 5 in September, the lack of success from other maegashira around him had given him an opening. He scored only three wins in his sanyaku debut, but one of those was over yokozuna Hokutoumi on the opening day. His 30th and last makuuchi appearance came in March 1989, and he had been unable to win a special prize in that time. He continued to fight for another three years. Following the retirement of Kurama in September 1989 he became the oldest man in any of the professional sumo divisions, and he was the last active sumo wrestler born in the Showa 20s (1945 to 1954).

Retirement from sumo
He retired in January, 1992 after a 22-year career, having fallen into the makushita division for the first time in seven years. As he had been unable to purchase or borrow elder stock in the Japan Sumo Association he had to leave the sumo world. He managed a sumo tea house in Utsunomiya, Tochigi Prefecture, until it closed in 2013.

Fighting style
Tamaryū was a yotsu-sumo wrestler who specialized in fighting on the mawashi or belt. He preferred a migi-yotsu grip (left hand outside, right hand inside) and his favourite kimarite were yorikiri (force out), uwatenage (outer arm throw) and leg trips.

Career record

See also
Glossary of sumo terms
List of past sumo wrestlers
List of komusubi

References

1954 births
Living people
Japanese sumo wrestlers
Sumo people from Nagasaki Prefecture
Komusubi